Silo cleaning is a process to maximize the efficiency of storage silos that hold bulk powders or granules.  In silos, material is fed through the top and removed from the bottom. Typical silo applications include animal feed, industrial powders, cement, and pharmaceuticals.

Free movement of stored materials, on a first-in, first-out basis, is essential in maximizing silo efficiency. The goal of silo efficiency is to ensure that the oldest material is used first and does not contaminate newer, fresher material. There are two major complications in silo efficiency: rat holing and bridging. Rat holing occurs when powders adhere to the sides of silos. Bridging occurs when material blocks at the silo base.

Manual cleaning is the simplest way to clean silos. This entails lowering a worker on a rope to free material inside the silo. Manual cleaning is dangerous due to the release of material and the possible presence of gases. In cases of bridging, an additional danger exists as the exit hole needs to be rodded from underneath, exposing the worker to falling powder.

Alternative cleaning methods include: 
Air blasters are a well-established cleaning method. Air cannons are expensive, however, as limited coverage requires purchase of multiple units. Air cannons are also noise intrusive and require high consumption of compressed air.
Vibrators are easy to fit into empty silos, but can cause structural damage and contribute to powder compaction.
Low friction linings are quiet, but expensive to install and prone to erosion which can then contaminate the environment or product.
Inflatable pads and liners are easy to install in empty silos and can help side-wall buildup but have no effect on bridging. Inflatable pads and liners are also hard to maintain and can cause compaction.
Fluidisation through a one-way membrane can help compacted material, but are expensive and difficult to install and maintain. These systems can also contribute to mechanical interlocking and bridging.
Acoustic cleaners are the latest and possibly safest way to clean silos as these systems are non-invasive and do not require silos to be emptied. Acoustic cleaning is also a preventative solution.
Pneumatic or hydraulic whip machines are portable machines used to "cut" build up on the walls of silos while being remotely operated from outside of the vessel.
Silo cleaning companies provide turn key silo cleaning services using several different kinds of methods (depending on the company).

Cleaning